The Hong Kong Open is a table tennis event held for the first time in 2018, as part of the 2018 ITTF World Tour. The event is organised by the Hong Kong Table Tennis Association, under the authority of the International Table Tennis Federation (ITTF).

Champions

See also
Asian Table Tennis Union

References

External links
International Table Tennis Federation

ITTF World Tour
Table tennis competitions
Table tennis competitions in Hong Kong
Recurring sporting events established in 2018